1981 Emmy Awards may refer to:

 33rd Primetime Emmy Awards, the 1981 Emmy Awards ceremony honoring primetime programming
 8th Daytime Emmy Awards, the 1981 Emmy Awards ceremony honoring daytime programming
 9th International Emmy Awards, the 1981 Emmy Awards ceremony honoring international programming

Emmy Award ceremonies by year